Marie-Pierre Leray (born 17 February 1975) is a French former competitive figure skater. In ladies' singles, she placed seventh at the 1994 World Championships and 14th at the 1994 Winter Olympics. As a pair skater, she won the 1993 French national title with Frédéric Lipka. She later teamed up with Nicolas Osseland. During her competitive career as an eligible skater, she also worked as a model. She continues to perform in ice shows throughout Europe, combining circus elements with skating.

Results

Ladies' singles

Pairs with Osseland

Pairs with Lipka

External links
 
 Official site of Marie-Pierre Leray and Nicolas Osseland

1975 births
French female pair skaters
French female single skaters
Figure skaters at the 1994 Winter Olympics
Living people
Olympic figure skaters of France
People from Villecresnes
Sportspeople from Val-de-Marne
Competitors at the 1994 Goodwill Games
Competitors at the 2001 Winter Universiade